Ivan Dimitrov (born August 5, 1986 in Sofia, Bulgaria) is a Bulgarian figure skater. He is the 2006 Bulgarian national bronze medalist. He placed 41st at the 2004 World Junior Figure Skating Championships.

Competitive highlights

 J = Junior level

References

External links
 Tracings.net profile

Bulgarian male single skaters
Living people
1986 births
Figure skaters from Sofia